Triple Bogey on a Par Five Hole is a 1991 independent crime film directed by Amos Poe. It was Philip Seymour Hoffman's film debut.

Plot
A couple of robbers focus on rich golfers and eventually meet their match with one last mark. Years later, a scriptwriter decides to observe the children of robbers who sail around Manhattan in the luxury yacht.

Cast
Eric Mitchell as Remy Gravelle
Daisy Hall as Amanda Levy
Alba Clemente as Nina Baccardi
Jesse McBride as Satch Levy
Angela Goethals as Bree Levy
Robbie Coltrane as Steffano Baccardi
John Schmerling as P.C. Brian O'Brien
Tom Cohen as Freddie Arnstein
Avital Dicker as Cookie
Philip Seymour Hoffman as Klutch (as Phil Hoffman)
Olga Bagnasco as Stacha (as Olga Bragnasco Starr)
John Heys as Roman
Lee Hegrin as Captain Aria (as Lee Nagrin)
May Au as The Masseuse
Chic Streetman as Joe Hawkins

Reception
Film Review considered the film to be "starkly original", and remarked that nobody in the film was innocent.

References

External links
 

1991 films
American independent films
American crime comedy films
1990s crime comedy films
1991 comedy films
1990s English-language films
1990s American films
1991 independent films